Bucharest Bar is the professional body of lawyers in the city of Bucharest, Romania. It is the largest bar in Romania, including approximately 9,000 active lawyers, representing almost half of the total number of lawyers across the country. Mainly, it is dedicated to serving their members, regulating the legal profession and organizing the mandatory legal assistance in its jurisdiction. In Romania, membership in bar associations is mandatory for practicing. The members of Bucharest Bar have general jurisdiction meaning that they are allowed to practice everywhere in Romania, but not only in Bucharest.

History
Bucharest Bar was founded on 30 September 1831 and reorganized on 24 June 1865 following the adoption of the first law in Romania regulating the "body of lawyers" (December 1864), Bar Bucharest (Ilfov Bar, as originally called) was the nucleus around which the legal practice has been developed in Romania.

Throughout its history, the Bucharest Bar has undergone several stages of development:
 1831-1865 were born the premises of legal practice in Romania;
 1865-1921 period was the age of formation and affirmation, followed by its consolidation (between the two World Wars);
 of distress during the Communist Regime;
 Post-Romanian Revolution revival and European integration.

Bucharest Bar Organization

General Assembly
 Consists of all lawyers (approximately 9,000 active lawyers) practicing in the city  of Bucharest.

Dean and Deputy Deans 
Currently (term 2011-2015):
 Ilie-Ion Iordăchescu (Dean)
 Ion Dragne (Deputy Dean)
 Alexandru Herbay (Deputy Dean)

Council of Bucharest Bar  
Bucharest Bar is run by a Council composed of 15 members / counsels, led by the Dean and two Deputy Deans. Each counselor coordinates an area / resort activity. Council is elected for a period of 4 years. The current Council of Bucharest Bar is elected for the mandate 2011-2015.

Masters of Bucharest Bar
 Aristide Pascal Constantin Bozianu, G. Vernescu, D. Gianni (in the earliest age of Bucharest Bar); 
 Nicolae Titulescu, Take Ionescu, CG Dissescu, Toma Stelian (at the end of the nineteenth century and early twentieth century);
 Micescu N. Istrate, "The Prince of Romanian lawyers", Dem. I. Dobrescu, Radu D. Rosetti, Petre Pandrea, (in the interbelic "golden age"); 
 Paul Vlahide, Nicolae Cerveni, Victor Anagnoste (in last quarter of the last century).

Affiliations  
Bucharest Bar is connected to the following European legal bodies:
 collective member of the Union Internationale des Avocat ( U.I.A.) since 1927 (www.uianet.org);
 collective member of the International Bar Association since 1992 (www.ibanet.org);
 founding collective member of the Black Sea Countries Bars Association (B.C.B.A.) since 1994; the B.C.B.A. joined the U.I.A. as an associated member in 1998 and it currently includes 15 bar associations of 8 countries in the Black Sea region: Romania, Bulgaria, Macedonia, Turkey, Republic of Moldova, Georgia, Azerbaijan and Albania.

The Bucharest Bar has been developing close cooperation with all the European bar associations as well as with other bar associations worldwide. It also develops cooperation with the American Bar Association.

References

Legal organizations based in Romania
Bar associations of Europe
Organizations established in 1831
Organizations based in Bucharest